Syed Muhammad Ibrahim bin Syed Fatehullah Kirmani 1513-1575C.E. (AH 919-982), more popularly known as Shaikh Daud Bandagi Kirmani was a 16th-century saint of the Qadiri order.

The Shrine of Shaikh Daud Bandagi Kirmani  

 
The mausoleum of Shaikh Daud Bandagi Kirmani in Shergarh, Punjab is an example of early Mughal architecture. The architect of the mausoleum, completed in AD 1580, was Ustad Baazid. His description of designing and building the shrine is extant in the 17th century hagiography of the saint, Maqamat-e-Daudi. The interior of the Husht Phelo (Octagonal) shrine is decorated with intricate Naqashi  (floral and geometric wall frescoes).  The eight interior alcoves and panels of the shrine are embellished with different naqashi patterns suggesting the unique signature work or style of the artists and artisans who with immense spiritual devotion built and decorated the shrine more than four centuries ago. On each of the eight interior lower alcoves are Persian couplets by Shah Abul Muali extolling the virtues of the saint. The grave of Daud Bandagi is in an enclosure located in the center of the shrine with the graves of six of his lineal descendants (Sajjada Nashin's) on either side. The exterior of the shrine has panels of intricate stucco tracery Manabat Kari on all sides including the outer alcoves. The shrine, today, is under the care of the Auqaf Department and the Archeology Department of the Government of Punjab, Pakistan. In the 1980s extensive restoration work was done on the mausoleum by the Archeology Department. The work inside the shrine was mainly on the preservation of the Naqashi frescoes.

Reproductions of some Naqashi Patterns found inside the Shrine of Daud Bandagi Kirmani by students of the Naqsh School of Arts, Lahore

The Account and Biography of Shaikh Daud Bandagi by Badaoni in Muntakhab-ut-Tawarikh (MT)  

Badaoni's description of his meeting with Shaikh Daud in Volume II of MT 

Now Husain Qulí Khán, who was besieging Nagarkot and the fort of Kangrah, heard of the Mirzá's doings, and having made an agreement with the Hindús and received from the people of Nagarkót five man of gold as a douceur, after reading the khutbah in the Emperor's name, set out from that place with Mirzá Yúsuf Khán and Masnadi 'Álí Fattú, a ghulám of 'Adalí, Ismá'íl Qulí Khán, Rájah Bírbar, and other Amírs, and pursued him as far as Sankrah. When Husain Khán heard news of this, under the influence of that madness which so often attacks the wits of poor mortals, he swore an oath that he would not touch food until he came up with Husain Qulí Khán. He crossed the river Biyáh at the ford of Talwandí, and went by forced marches to Sher Gadh a dependency of Jahní. There he paid a visit to his reverence Shaikh Dá'úd Qádirí Jahní-wál, the greatest Pole-star, the master and asylum of sainthood (God sanctify his tomb!). When food was served, he excused himself from eating on account of his oath. The Shaikh observed that it was easy to atone for an oath, but silly to distress one's friends. The Khán immediately called for a slave, and set him free, and thus atoned for his oath. He then partook of food, and benefited by the gracious words which he heard. He remained there that night. The monastery of the Shaikh provided entertainment for all the party, and his private fields furnished grass and corn for the horses. In the morning he left the place.

Three days after this I came from Láhór to Sher Gadh, and attended his reverence for four days, seeing and hearing such things as had never entered my imagination, and the mystery of the saying, “When they desire the remembrance of God &c.” became manifest. And I extemporized some verses, which I presented, and they were accepted. The verses are as follows:—

 O! the stock of thine origin is free from water and clay, 
 Thy pure spirit like the Prophet is the mercy of the worlds.
 Thy mighty name is David, through the impression of it,
 Like Solomon, spirits and men come under thy signet.
 “There is the face of God”, I could not understand for years,
 I saw thy face, and the pupil of the eye of truth became clear. 

I requested to be allowed to renounce the work and burden of worldly affairs, and to choose for myself the office of sweeping the monastery. But he would not permit it, and said that I ought now to go to Hindústán. So I took leave in such a desolate state of mind and distraction of heart, as may no other ever experience, and prepared to depart. At the moment of departure lamentation involuntarily burst forth from my sorrowing soul, and when this came to the ears of his reverence, although no one is properly allowed to remain in that monastery more than three days, he kept me there a fourth, and told me things, the sweetness of which still remains in my heart:—

 I go homeward from this door,
 But my heart is without choice:
 I lament so much that you would think
 I was going to a foreign country.

The Biography of the Shaikh by Badoani in Vol III of MT 
 
Chatī or Jhenni (modern day Chunnian) is the chief town of a pargana in the District of Lāhōr. The Shaikh's noble ancestors came first from the land of the Arabs to Sītpūr, which is in the Multān country, and the holy Shaikh was himself born in that place. His noble father proceeded  from this world to eternity before his birth, and his mother died very shortly after it, and he, left alone, as an incomparable pearl, was brought up under the guardianship of his elder brother, Miyān Rahmatu-'llāh. When they set him tasks in the reading of the Qurā'n, tears would sometimes flow over the surface of his blessed cheeks, and he would say, “Trouble me not in respect of this matter, but leave me unto God the Most High.” From this time they knew that he had no need of any acquired learning.

 Couplet. 
“What need had he of instruction in polite learning,
“Who was himself from the first well learned therein?”

They say that one of the two princes of both worlds, either Imām Hasan or Imām Husain, (may God be gratified with them!), it cannot be decided which, taught the holy Shaikh in a dream some verses from the first chapter of the Qur'an, and sometimes when he went, to refresh his heart, to watch the play of children, he would dejectedly and perplexedly watch them from afar, and would say, “I see their faces scratched, their bodies covered with blood, and their skin torn off, and some of them appear to me as though they had lost their heads.”

When, after many temporal vicissitudes and various hardships, he came to the pargana town of Satgarah, and from there to Lāhōr, he commenced to study under Maulānā Isma‘īl of Uch, who had received instruction from his highness the lord Maulavī ‘Ārif-i-Jāmī, (may God sanctify his tomb!), and in early youth he read the commentary of Isfahānī with such critical acumen,* that the best students from among the natives of the country, who were reading that book in class with him, stood astonished at the perspicuous quickness of his apprehension and the clearness of his intellect, and his tutor said, “Friends, just as we, in our time, used to rejoice and contend for superiority in the sight of our respected master, so too will this lad, before long, attain to such a degree of respect that the people will look towards him with blessing and benediction, and from his noble and profitable words will gain advantage and excellence.” At last he became a living witness (of the truth of) and (one might say) the source of (the saying), “Blessed is he who hath seen me or hath seen one who hath seen me.”

 Couplet.
“My love, though he went not to school, nor wrote a line,
“By means of one glance instructed a hundred teachers in(difficult) problems.”

And, having attained the position of a most learned sage he was rejoiced with the good news of the sacred text, “O David, verily have we made thee a vicegerent.” And at the very time when he was employed in the exercise of harsh and severe austerities, having conceived, by means of the attractions of God,—“which are equal to the acts of both men and jinn,”— strong craving after God, his spiritual holiness Ghaus-a-Saqalain (Shaikh Abdul-Qadir Gilani) (may God be pleased with him!) evinced, in all circumstances, great interest in his progress, and became his helper, assister, and guardian, keeping his regard always fixed upon him, openly listening to and returning favourable answers to his petitions, until he perforce drew him, after the manner of beloved ones who are attracted, and attracted ones who are beloved, to the court of saintship, Divine guidance, and perfection, to the closet of propinquity (to God), to the chamber of the grandeur of God, and to the resting-place of the Holiness of the Lord of Majesty. When under the influence of this strong craving after God he used to wander bare-headed and bare-foot in the desert about Dībālpūr, the dwelling-place of beasts of prey, wild animals, and birds, in a spot now known as Shīrgarh:—

 Hemistich. 
“We are lovers wandering in the plains of Damascus.”

And sometimes when he went to circumambulate* the blessed shrine of that holy Saint, obeyed of all the world, Ganj-i-Shakar, (may God sanctify his tomb!) he would there receive signs, and experience happy visions, and engage in conversation and intercourse (with the saint's spirit), a detailed account of which is beyond the limits of this hastily compiled history. They are recounted in detail in the book (known as) Naghmāt-i-Dā'ūdī, which was written by that cream of saints and fruit of the pure at heart, Shaikh Abū-'l-Ma‘ālī, the son of Shaikh Rahmatu-'llāh, already mentioned, the date of whose most fortunate birth may be deduced from the words “the beggar of Shaikh Dā'ūd,” or from the words “Abū-'l-Ma‘ālī, the worshipper of the true (God),” and who is now the successor of Shaikh Mīyān Dā'ūd, (may God sanctify his soul!). When he had spent a period of twenty years, or thereabouts, in ecstatic longing after God and wandering over plains and deserts, he was inspired to revert to a regular mode of life and to the religious instruction of the people, but since he had had no outward religious instructor and guide he hesitated to undertake the charge, until he was initiated and appointed by his spiritual holiness Ghaus-i-A‘zam* for the following duty, namely, to assist, for the sake of preserving the spiritual succession, the reverend Shaikh Hāmid-i-Qādirī. (may God sanctify his tomb!) who was the son of Shaikh ‘Abdu-'l-Qādir the second, and the father of Shaikh ‘Abdu-'l-Qādir,  who at the time of writing is occupying his venerable father's place in Ucch, by drawing him (more closely) to God. And the late saint, (may God have mercy upon him!) since he had already many times asked for assistance from this disciple, who was after his own heart, and turned to him in every important business, and had asked that a fātihah might be offered up on his (the late saint's) behalf, delayed to draw up his blessed tree of spiritual succession and to issue a permit for perfecting of disciples until he himself went one day to the town of Satkara,* where the saint (may God have mercy upon him!) had many times previously lodged, on which occasion, when under the influence of his ecstatic longing after God, he said, “Here is Shaikh Ghaus-i-A‘zam (may God be pleased with him!) who has come and signifies that he entrusts to me his prayer-carpet, staff, tree of spiritual succession, horse, covered litter, and all the appurtenances of Shaikh-dom and spiritual leadership.” When the saint (may God sanctify his tomb!) was informed from on high of that occurrence, and when his knowledge of it was afterwards completely confirmed, he entrusted the divine charge committed to him to him whom his soul desired, but who appeared as though he were the seeker (not the sought after), returning from his soaring flight (of ecstasy) to ordinary intercourse (with his fellow creatures), and spread the mat of sojourning in the newly built town of Shīrgarh, near to Chatī, and half-way between Multān and Pattan, started a new order, the Qādirīyyah, which is midway between the two exalted orders, Sahrawardiyyah and Cishtiyyah, (blessings on them, all three, from God!) and in the Divine power and by means of close connection with the true God, he so carried forward* the work that the sound issuing therefrom will not die away until the sounding of the last trump.

When Mullā Abdullāh of Sultānpūr, who was known as Makhdūmu-l-Mulk, girded his loins to strenuous efforts in uprooting the men of God, becoming the means of the death of several of them, he sent an imperial order in the name of Salīm Shāh Sūr, the Afghān, from Gwāliyār, summoning the holy Miyān among others, in obedience to which order the Miyān set out in haste with one or two attendants, and, meeting Makhdūmu-'l-Mulk, outside Gwāliyār, with marks of the greatest respect, alighted in a spot where he sat down with him, and where a beneficial conversation took place. The pernicious mischief-makers, as soon as they witnessed this conversation, fled away to every corner, so that they could not be discovered even by search being made. Makhdūmu-l-Mulk said, “Their report is not on this ground (alone) falsified.” After much talk and conversation the Shaikh asked “What was the real motive for summoning us religious mendicants?” Makhdūmu-l-Mulk replied, “I heard that your disciples, when performing the religious exercise of zikr, said "O Dā'ūd, O Dā'ūd!” The Shaikh replied “There has probably been some mistake in hearing, owing to a similarity of sounds, or else my followers must have said ‘O Wadūd, O Wadūd!’ In connection with this matter the Shaikh remained for a whole day, or a whole night, bestowing on him sublime exhortations and advice, and imparting to him precious knowledge and facts relating to God. Makhdūmu-l-Mulk was much affected and dismissed the Shaikh from that place with honour.

On one occasion the austerity and piety of Miyān Hisāmu-'d-dīn of Talamba, may God have mercy upon him! (some of whose glorious attributes are mentioned in the Najātu-'r-Rashīd) happened to be the subject of conversation in the noble assembly of the Shaikh, and he said “Ah, what a pity was it that the Miyān failed in personal desire of and love for God, and was the slave of mere morality:—

 Hemistich. 
“Thou hast kept one thing, and (many) things are lost to thee.”
“Beware, at the last,* from whom thou remainest apart.”

The liberality and charity of the Shaikh's disposition were such that on certain fixed occasions, either once or twice in the year, he scattered abroad in promiscuous charity all the money and goods that he had received gratuitously, and he and his chaste wife kept nothing in the cell that was their dwelling but an earthen pot and a piece of old matting, and when he saw that his treasure-chest was full he would again in the same manner disburse its contents in promiscuous charity, and notwithstanding this (profusion), on the birth-day and feast-day of the holy Ghaus-i-Azam (may God be pleased with him!) all the needs of the pilgrims, whether of high or low degree, who, to the number of nearly a hundred thousand souls, more or less, were gathered together, were met by disbursements from the alms-chest of his hospice, and that profusion, praise be to God, is still continued, nay rather, is increased many fold. Some of the auspicious utterances of his inspired tongue, the interpreter of divine truths, are as follows:—

“In the name of God, the Director and Guide in the darkness of occans and deserts.” I have many times seen and experienced the efficiency of this holy saying in positions of fear* and danger. Another is:—

“Praised be He in respect of Whose Essence our thoughts are bewildered,"
“Praised be He in respect of the understanding of Whom our understanding soars.”

And there are many other examples of such prayers, praises ẕikrs and choice phrases, and the signet-ring posy of that holy man, composed by himself, was as follows:—

“Dā'ūd has been effaced in name and trace"
“For poverty effaces all traces.”

When I, the author of these pages, in the time of Bairām Khān, (that best of times, when India was as a bride,) was a student in Āgra, I heard from certain darvīshes great reports of the Shaikh's noble and majestic attributes, and from that time forward I sowed the seed of attachment to and trust in him in the ground of preparation (for meeting him) and was in secret a slave to this desire (of meeting him).

 Hemistich.
“Aye, verily doth the ear, in true lovers, outstrip the eye.” 

And at that very time I repeatedly made attempts to go and pay my respects to that holy man, clothing myself in the pilgrim's garment meet for the circumambulation of that threshold around which the angels do go, and set out for Shīrgarh (with this object). But sometimes my father, who has now obtained pardon and forgiveness of his sins, withstood me and turned me back in the way, and sometimes I was let by other hindrances, which were the means of disappointing me of the fruition of that good fortune. A period of twelve years passed over me, thus expectant, before one of the servants of that court, Shaikh Kālū by name, a solitary traveller, who had himself formerly been the means of my secret knowledge of the Shaikh, like the humā, from hidden regions cast his shadow on Badāon and its environs, and said to me, “Is it not a pity that the holy Miyān (Shaikh Dā'ūd) should be in the land of the living and that you should (be content to) rest with hope unfulfilled and should not even once see him?” This soul-subduer kindled a fire in my perplexed soul, and the Most High God provided the means (of the fulfilment of my desire), for Muham-mad Husain Khān, in whose personal service I was, went in pursuit of Ibrāhīm Husain Mīrzā from Kānt u Gūla towards the Panjāb, and the means of attaining that happiness were thus prepared for me, so that, as has been already mentioned, I went to Shīrgarh from Lāhōr, and saw with my own eyes a portion of the (spiritual) beauty of the holy man—and what possessor of beauty can be compared to him? As he smiled and spoke light sparkled from his teeth, a light which illuminated the dark abode of the heart, and from which the secret of the Countenance of God was manifested. In short for the space of three or four days I acquired some advantage from this transitory life.

Few days passed on which Hindus, to the number of fifty or a hundred, more or less (on each day), did not come with their families and kindred to pay their respects to that holy man, receiving the high honour of conversion to Islām, and obtaining instruction in the faith. I found the gates and walls and trees and dwellings of that delectable town filled with the sound of the telling of rosaries and the reciting of God's praises, and the Shaikh bestowed on me his auspicious cap, saying, “Be thou my deputy to thine own people, for (thus to appoint a deputy) is my wont,” and he sent a kerchief and a veil from his chaste wife to my wives and children, and when I made a representation to him, saying, “If you bestow on me the gift of a shirt, it will be light upon light.” After some reflection he said “That also will arrive in due time.” Having disclosed to him some of the secrets of my heart and my designs and intentions, I endeavoured to obtain leave to depart. At this point that holy man left his masjid in his closed travelling litter, owing to his great weakness, and set out for my first halting-place. I, taking the pole of the litter on my shoulder, walked for some paces with it. While I was thus employed a powerful fit of weeping overcame me, and the Shaikh, stopping the litter, said, “Put me down.” He alighted, and sat down, and spoke so much of the knowledge and love of God, the Most High, that my agitation re-doubled. One day, at the time of leave-taking, I represented, through Mīyāṅ Abdu-l-Wahhāb, one of the Shaikh's sincere companions, (to whom is applicable the text), “Blessedness awaiteth them and a goodly home,” that a report was current among the holy men of Hindustān that the time for the rising of a religious leader was at hand, that most of that body, (i.e., the holy men,) concurred in fixing on one of the Sayyids of that country, whose ancestors had formerly been seated on the throne of empire in Dihlī and Badāon for some time, that they were engaged in making preparations for a holy war and in collecting, arms, that they professed to have received directions from the holy Ghaus-i-Azam  (may God be pleased with him!) to engage in this affair, and that they had implicated with themselves some of the Amīrs on the frontier, and that some of them professed to have received supernatural encouragement during their assemblies and when they were in difficulties, and purposed to bring the object of their desire to an issue. The Shaikh asked me, “What is that Sayyid's mode of life, and condition?” I said “He is a man who lives a retired life, in holy poverty, conformably to the sacred law, a recluse and an ascetic who has resigned himself to God, passing most of his days among the tombs (of holy men) and his nights in his cell in worship and submission to God, but he is a man of good family, unrivalled and incomparable in his knowledge of the military art, of excellent moral character and following a most worthy mode of life.” The Shaikh said “The members of that body (i.e., the holy men), are no true darvīshes, in that they so traduce the holy Ghaus, and do him violence now that he can no longer help himself, and those spiritual encouragements and signs are all part of the delusions of Satan, for how could the holy Ghaus (may God be pleased with him!) countenance such matters as this, he whose rule it always was that the people should expel the love of the world from their hearts, and, in all candour and sincerity, should set their faces towards the love of God, the Most High, abandoning vain desires and lusts, and not that one should turn aside from the path of worship, asceticism and holy endeavour to fall again into the net of the world, which is the enemy of God? Say to that Sayyid from me, “May God the Most High vouchsafe to you grace to stand fast in the path which you hold. If the least suspicion of any desire for evanescent delights remains (in your heart), it behoves you to strive to overcome it, and not to be beguiled by the impostures and misrepresentations of a bewildered band of know-nothings, thereby straying from the path. Though the lover of the world should attain to kingship, the supreme object of worldly men, and the seeker after the (sensual) joys of paradise should reach the rewards bestowed by the Everlasting God, that is, the maidens and mansions of the next world, and the lover of God should die of grief from the utter hopelessness of attaining his object, yet is the disappointment of this last a thousandfold better and more happy than the fruition and attainment of desire experienced by the former two classes of poor-spirited men.” And the Shaikh, speaking on this subject, scattered amongst us so many jewels of profitable advice that pearl-like tears began to fall from the eyes of those that heard him, upon the skirts of their robes, and, that (worldly) object being forgotten, we were thrown into quite a different frame of mind, one above description, and in that state of burning anguish I bade the Shaikh adieu, uttering cries of grief.

“My heart, in the hope that one cry might perchance reach thee,
“Has uttered in this mountain lamentations such as were never uttered by Farhād.”

And since the roads between Lāhōr and Shirgarh were, in consequence of the rebellion of the Ulugh Baigī Mīrzās, closed, both at the time of my going to Shīrgarh and at the time of my return, and as I was alone, the Shaikh gave me an attendant as a guide, who was to take me to Shaikh Abū Ishāq-i-Mihrang in Lāhōr, one of the most noted of the holy man's deputies, in order that he might arrange to send me with a caravan to the army of Husain Khān, which had come to Lāhōr from Talamba, and was to proceed thence to Kānt-u-Gūla. “When I reached Lāhōr I set out for Hindustān with Husain Khān's men.” I was sitting one day at our halting-place at Sahāranpūr* in a garden, consumed with grief at my separation from that holy man, when a traveller brought to me a Qādirī shirt, which he had in his hand, saying, “Take this, which I received from the hand of a venerable saint, and give me something to help me on my way.” When I questioned him as to the truth of the matter he said, “When Mīrzā Ibrāhīm Husain met with that mischance I, with a party of his troops, overwhelmed with misfortune and a prey to plunderers, arrived stripped and naked at Shīrgarh, where we attached ourselves to the holy saint, our helper, and he gave something to each of us. When my turn came round he took this shirt off his blessed body, and bestowed it upon me. I, thinking that it would be irreverent to wear it, deposited it in safe custody, with a view to taking it away to some place as a rare gift; and now I leave it with you.” I received from him that mysteriously conveyed gift, that treasure wafted to me by the wind, as though it had been a blessing and benediction.

 Verses. 
 The perfume of thy shirt has reached me,
 My soul was ravished by that sweet odour.
 I had offered a fātihah for union with thee,
 Praise be to God that my fātihah was accepted.

And, remembering the word that he had spoken, I regarded this occurrence as a miracle, and I now preserve that Joseph's coat as I preserve my life—and praise be to God for all this!

 Verses. 
 And as I have been the companion of desire for his excellency
 From the cradle, I hope that (that desire) will continue to the grave.

 Verses. 
Desire for thee within my mind, and love for thee within my heart,
Did enter me with mother's milk, and with my life will leave me.

The following is a brief account of that holy man. He was the cynosure of his time, an inspired prophet, and a worker of wonders and manifest miracles, giving clear proofs of his sanctity. He had undergone severe discipline and in holy endeavour had striven much. In early life* he acquired exoteric knowledge and had also been engaged in teaching. He had resigned himself to God and lived an eremite, going never to the houses of worldly men but once, when in obedience to the (royal) command he went from Shīrgaṛh to Gwāliyār to see Salīm Shāh, and although the Khalīfah of the age, when he was proceeding to Patan sent Shahbāz Khān to summon the Shaikh to bestow on him the honour of a visit, the Shaikh made his excuses, saying, “My secret prayers are sufficient.” He avoided to the utmost of his power the companionship of the lords of the earth, investing himself with the cloak of “Poverty is my glory.” He was constant in almsgiving, and in pointing out to searchers after truth the path of holiness, and whosoever was so aided by fortune as to be led to the Shaikh received great profit from the precious utterances of that blessing of the age and cynosure of the world. In the year H. 982 (A.D. 1574-5) his tent was pitched under the curtain of the Majesty of God the Most High, and in the Court of union with Him, may His glory be exalted! The words “Ah, Shaikh Dā'ūd the Saint!” were found to give the date (of his death). May God bestow upon him His boundless mercy, and raise us with him in that hour when all shall be gathered together.

Further reading 
‘Muntakhab-ut-Tawarikh’, Vol II and III, by Abdul Qadir bin Mulik Shah Al-Badaoni (Translated into English by R.A Ranking in 1894).
‘Tazkara’ by Maulana Abul Kalam Azad.
‘Maqamat-e-Daudi’ by Abul Baqi Bin Jan Mohammad, original in Persian circa AD 1646. (Translated into Urdu by Dr. Khwaja Hameed Yazdani. Publisher S.M Mohsin).
'Akhbaar-Ul-Akhiyaar' by Shaikh Abdul Haq Muhaddis Dehlavi. ( Urdu translation by Professor Ghulam Rasool Mehr). Maktaba Usmania. Hyderabad.A.P. India.
 'Safinat-ul-Auliya' by Dara Shikoh.

References

External links 
 Article on Shergarh: 
 Muntakhab-ut-Tawarikh can be downloaded from: 
 Shergarh on the map: 

Sufi saints
1513 births
1575 deaths